Blackhead is a small coastal settlement in Hawke's Bay, New Zealand. It is located on the east coast of the North Island of New Zealand, about 74 kilometres south of Napier. Blackhead Beach is a sandy beach, similar to other Hawke's Bay beaches such as Shoal Beach. The original Māori name for the beach is Te Pariomahu and this is more commonly used by local hapū.

There is a marine reserve located offshore from Blackhead Beach.

Activities such as swimming, diving, sun bathing, surfing and other recreational water activities are popular at Blackhead. Commercial water operations such as fishing are not very common at Blackhead due to the nearby marine reserve forbidding harm to the marine wildlife. Fishing outside of the reserve is common. The settlement includes a few coastal beach properties and a campground.

Te Angiangi Marine Reserve covers an area offshore from Blackhead. School groups, families, and visitors to the area can explore the tidal pools at low tide and dive in the pools within the Marine Reserve so long as no marine life is moved or taken. Scuba diving and snorkelling in the waters within the Te Angiangi Marine Reserve enables the public to enjoy the rich marine life in its natural habitat. There is an information board at Blackhead about the many coastal birds in the area.

Marae

The Pourerere Marae, located near Blackhead, is a tribal meeting ground for the Ngāti Kahungunu hapū of Ngāi Te Ōatua and Ngāti Tamaterā.

References

Central Hawke's Bay District
Beaches of the Hawke's Bay Region
Populated places in the Hawke's Bay Region